Scholven Power Station is a coal-fired power plant in Gelsenkirchen, Germany.  With an installed capacity of 2,126 megawatts, it is one of the largest power stations in Europe. It is owned by Uniper.

Structure 

Two power station units present on the location were beaconed up to their shut-down with oil. The power produced in the power station Scholven covers about 3% of the German current need. The units B - E, the long-distance heating power station Buer (FWK) and the steam work Scholven (DWS) supply steam to neighbouring chemistry enterprises and long-distance heating to some surrounding cities. The 302-metre-high chimneys, which are the second highest in Germany, form an impressing industrial skyline together with the 7 cooling towers. An interesting feature is that the smokestack used by units B-E has three booms, at which the conductors of the 220 kV-line leaving Unit D are fixed. The power station area and the neighbouring waste dump of the coal mine Scholven became a film scene in the Tatort "The ball in the body" of 1979.

History 

The power station was an enterprise for the covering of the internal requirement at river and steam of the coal mine Scholven. Soon however, a high performance main power station developed from it. In the years 1968 to 1971 the almost identically constructed blocks B to E went into operation, in 1974 and 1975 followed G and H (50% portion of RWE power), 1979 the block F and at the end of 1985 the long-distance heating power station Buer (FWK). Block G was shut down in summer 2001 and Block H finally in summer 2003.

External links 

 http://www.skyscraperpage.com/diagrams/?b2604

Buildings and structures in Gelsenkirchen
Coal-fired power stations in Germany
Chimneys in Germany
Uniper
Economy of Gelsenkirchen